Life in Colour is a 2021 British-Australian nature documentary miniseries presented and narrated by David Attenborough. It consists of three episodes.

Production
The series was co-produced by Humble Bee Films and Sealight Pictures for Netflix, the BBC, Stan, and the Nine Network. Sharmila Choudhury served as a producer. It was originally envisaged as having four episodes, but this was scaled back to three due to the COVID-19 pandemic.

The first episode of Life in Colour aired on 28 February 2021 on BBC One and on 3 July 2021 on Nine Network in Australia.

Episodes
Viewing data sourced from BARB.

Reception
The Hindu's Aswathi Pacha praised the series, noting Attenborough's enthusiasm. Common Sense Media gave the series four out of five stars. Yvonne Bohwongprasert's review for the Bangkok Post was generally positive, but criticised the film for failing to mention the "ongoing climate crisis".

Notes

References

External links
 
 

David Attenborough
2021 British television series debuts
2021 British television series endings
2020s British documentary television series
English-language Netflix original programming
BBC television documentaries
BBC high definition shows
Nine Network original programming
Nature educational television series